

Summary

Slalom
An NOC may enter up to 1 boat in each slalom event at the Olympics.  Qualification places are awarded to the NOC and not to the athletes.

Qualification timeline:

Places:

* Algeria  received the African spot, but decided not to take place, leaving its place to Kenya, who chose not to participate, either. According to the classification rules, Brazil received the quota place as the next best country in the American qualification tournament.

** New Zealand received the spot, but decided not to take place, Canada received the quota place as the next best country in the American qualification tournament.

Flatwater
An NOC may enter 1 boat in each flatwater competition. Qualification place is awarded to the NOC and not to the athletes.
The Host Nation is awarded 1 boat in K-1 Men, K-1 Women and C-1 Men events and if they do not qualify through the world championships, the lowest ranked boat from the world championships will be replaced by the boat from the Host Nation.

First allocation

Qualification timeline:

Minimum boat quota places:

Second allocation

The IOC caps the total number of athletes in the flat water competition, which determines the minimum boat quota places listed above.  However, an athlete may represent his NOC in more than one event, in which case an additional Athlete Quota Place becomes available.  The additional entry is awarded to the next best ranked NOC at the corresponding Continental Qualification in which the NOC of the repeating athlete competes.

Second allocation after global qualification :

K-1 500m Men: 4 Europe, 1 America, 1 Africa
K-1 1000m Men: 3 Europe, 1 America
K-2 500m Men: 1 Europe
K-2 1000m Men: -
K-4 1000m Men: -
C-1 500m Men: 4 Europe, 1 America, 1 Africa
C-1 1000m Men: 1 Europe, 1 Oceania
C-2 500m Men: 2 Europe, 1 America, 1 Asia
C-2 1000m Men: -
K-1 500m Women: 5 Europe, 1 Asia, 2 America
K-2 500m Women: 4 Europe
K-4 500m Women: -

Tripartite Commission Invitation

K-1 500m Men & K-1 1000m Men: ,

Additional

Athletes filling a quota place in one event may compete in other events as well

K-4 1000m Men: -
C-2 500m Men: , 
K-4 500m Women: -

References
International Canoe Federation
2008 Olympic Qualification System
Flatwater Racing Quotas Situation after Global Qualification Competition
National Federations Qualified for the Olympic Games 21.07.08

Qualification
Qualification for the 2008 Summer Olympics
Olympics qualification
Olympics qualification